This is a list of German companies by employees in 1907. The largest 127 companies of the German Empire in 1907 accounted for 7.8 percent of all employees in the German Empire; excluding railways and state-owned enterprises the share was only 3.6 percent. This compares to corresponding percentage shares of 8.2 respectively 4.6 for the United Kingdom at the same time. The largest German companies were predominantly in the heavy industries (mining, coal, iron, iron ore, steel and  metals), accounting for 38.7 percent of all employees and the transport and communication sector (railways, postal service, shipping), accounting for 45.4 percent of all employees. State-owned enterprises such as the state railways companies, the postal administration, the Prussian state mines, military workshops and the Imperial shipyards are dominant among the very largest companies.

Companies by employees
The list is based on Wardley (1999), who compiled data from three different sources: the work of Kocka and Siegrist (1979) and Fiedler (1999) on German companies in 1907, and the work of Kunz (1990) on Prussian state-owned enterprises in 1913. Given the shortage of historical employment data some employment numbers are only estimates and some companies might be missing from this list. Employment numbers are including all subsidiaries as long as the parent company is the majority shareholder, that is, holds more than 50 percent of the stock. Employee numbers are not including those employed in foreign subsidiaries. The only two companies in 1907 with large foreign subsidiaries were Siemens with 19.9 percent of the workforce employed abroad (8,542 employees) and Mannesmann with 34 percent of the workforce employed abroad (2,680 employees). With the de Wendel'sche Berg-und Hüttenwerke the list also includes the German subsidiary of the French de Wendel group. Originally this establishment was located in France, but became part of the German empire with the annexation of Alsace-Lorraine in 1871.

See also
Economic history of Germany
List of companies by employees
List of German companies by employees in 1938
German company law
UK company law

Notes

References
General

External links
 Big Business webpage by Peter Wardley

!
Companies, Employees 1907
Companies, Employees 1907 
Companies, Employees 1907
Employees 1907
Companies, Employees
1907 German Companies, Employees